Igny may refer to one of the following communes in France:

 Igny, Essonne, in the Essonne department
 Igny, Haute-Saône, in the Haute-Saône department
 Igny-Comblizy, in the Marne department
 Igny Abbey, in the Marne department